Sir Richard Lionel Cheltenham (born 20 December 1941) is a Barbadian politician. He was President of the Senate of Barbados from 2018 to 2020.

Political career 
Cheltenham was the Member of Parliament for Christ Church East from 1976 to 1981.

Education 

 University of the West Indies
 McGill University
 Manchester University

References 

Living people
1941 births
Presidents of the Senate of Barbados
Knights
University of the West Indies alumni
Barbados Labour Party politicians
Members of the House of Assembly of Barbados
Government ministers of Barbados
Justice ministers of Barbados
McGill University Faculty of Law alumni
Alumni of the University of Manchester

20th-century Barbadian politicians
21st-century Barbadian politicians